Poltringen Airfield is a private airfield located in Poltringen, which belongs to the town of Ammerbuch, Germany. It is only open to airplanes and gliders of the aviation clubs Ammerbuch, Herrenberg and Unterjesingen. Exceptions must be approved by the administration of the Tübingen region.

The airfield traffic pattern for airplanes is west of the airfield at 2700 ft.

Buildings and structures in Tübingen (district)
Airports in Baden-Württemberg